Lake Meke is a volcanic crater lake 
composed of two nested lakes located in Konya Province, central Turkey. It is a registered natural monument of the country and a Ramsar site.
Lake Meke is located in Karapınar district of Konya Province.

It was formed by the flooding of the crater of an extinct volcano, which took shape about 4 million years ago when the volcano erupted. About 9,000 years ago, a second eruption formed another volcanic cone inside the lake with a maar. Lake Meke now consists of two lakes with various islets. The volcanic cone island resisted erosion by the harsh weather conditions due to its massive material, and has retained its form for thousands of years.

Protected areas
Lake Meke was declared a first grade protected area in 1989. It was registered as a natural monument in 1998. On June 21, 2005, the lake and its surrounding area was declared a Ramsar site because of its international importance for wildfowl.

Declining water level
A scientist from Selçuk University in Konya stated in 2009 that the lake had nearly dried up. He stated that the reason behind this was the uncontrolled extraction of water for agricultural irrigation and overdrafting. In 2012, it was reported that the lake's capacity had decreased by about 60% within the last twenty years and that there was a risk that it would dry out completely.
In many sections of the lake, the water was becoming increasingly saline and crystallization was occurring. A drought season in 2014 caused a lowering of the groundwater level which was responsible for the further drying out of the lake to an extent of almost 99%. The remaining water body was turned red by the large quantity of microorganisms present in the brackish water. Nearly a hundred species of bird which were previously seen at the lake, had by 2015 moved elsewhere.

Gallery

References

External links

Lakes of Turkey
Lakes of Konya Province
Natural monuments of Turkey
Ramsar sites in Turkey
Volcanic crater lakes
Protected areas established in 1998
1998 establishments in Turkey